White Bear Lake is a lake in northeastern Ramsey County and western Washington County in the U.S. state of Minnesota, in the northeast part of the Minneapolis-St. Paul metropolitan area. The city of White Bear Lake takes its name from the lake.

History 
In Life on the Mississippi (1883), American author Mark Twain wrote:The White-bear Lake is less known. It is a lovely sheet of water, and is being utilized as a summer resort by the wealth and fashion of the State. It has its club-house, and its hotel, with the modern improvements and conveniences; its fine summer residences; and plenty of fishing, hunting, and pleasant drives. There are a dozen minor summer resorts around about St. Paul and Minneapolis, but the White-bear Lake is the resort.Twain also noted the Native American tradition of maple sugar making on the island in White Bear Lake:Every spring, for perhaps a century, or as long as there has been a nation of red men, an island in the middle of White-bear Lake has been visited by a band of Indians for the purpose of making maple sugar.

The Legend of White Bear Lake 
In 1883, Mark Twain documented a version of The Legend of White Bear Lake which he ridiculed.

In 2016 a musical, The Legend of White Bear Lake, was produced by Youth Music Theatre UK and produced at the Barbican Theatre, Plymouth, England. Book music and lyrics were by Caroline Wigmore and Jennifer Green. The musical told the tale of the white bear after whom the lake is named.

References

Lakes of Minnesota
Lakes of Ramsey County, Minnesota
Lakes of Washington County, Minnesota